The Victory at Sea is a 1920 military history book by Admiral William Sims in collaboration with Burton J. Hendrick. It concern's Sims' career in the Atlantic theater of World War I. It  won the 1921 Pulitzer Prize for History.

References

External links 
 

Pulitzer Prize for History-winning works
History books about World War I